Samir Amirèche (born 28 June 1972) is a former professional footballer who played as a defender. Born in France, he made five appearances for the Algeria national team at international level.

References

External links
 

Living people
1972 births
Footballers from Paris
Association football defenders
Algerian footballers
French footballers
Algeria international footballers
French sportspeople of Algerian descent
C.F. União players
Étoile Sportive du Sahel players
Le Havre AC players
Paris Saint-Germain F.C. players
US Créteil-Lusitanos players
Ligue 2 players
Qatar Stars League players
Olympique Noisy-le-Sec players
Al-Gharafa SC players
UJA Maccabi Paris Métropole players
Algerian expatriate sportspeople in Tunisia
Expatriate footballers in Tunisia
Algerian expatriate sportspeople in Portugal
Expatriate footballers in Portugal
Algerian expatriate sportspeople in Qatar
Expatriate footballers in Qatar